Leuchtturm des Chaos ( or Lighthouse of Chaos) is a 1983 documentary profile of the American actor Sterling Hayden (1916 – 1986).

The film features discussions with Hayden concerning his life and career, intercut with clips and stills from his films. It follows the actor through several long and digressive afternoon conversations with the German filmmakers aboard the barge in France on which he was living. Hayden smokes hashish and drinks heavily throughout, telling the filmmakers that they "have a record of exactly what alcoholism is". Hayden recounts his shame at having co-operated with the House Un-American Activities Committee during the Second Red Scare, his pride in his achievements as a sailor, and adopts a scornful attitude towards his illustrious career as a Hollywood film icon.

The film was shown at the 1983 Edinburgh Film Festival, where it was one of a few independent films singled out for praise by critic Steve McIntyre in an otherwise disappointing event. In a review for The New York Times, critic Janet Maslin cited the film as an example of "documentary film making ... at its most laissez faire", lamenting that "[e]very discussion is allowed to proceed far beyond its natural conclusion". She criticised the filmmakers' reluctance to rein in Hayden's "diffuseness of thought", "stilted" cinematography, inclusion of trivial and uninteresting details from the interviews, and their nonchalant and distanced attitude towards the actor. Maslin's review concludes:

References

External links

1983 films
1983 documentary films
German documentary films
West German films
Documentary films about actors
1980s English-language films
1980s German films